Wet Hot American Summer: Ten Years Later is a satirical comedy streaming television miniseries set in 1991 in a summer camp and New York City.

Created by David Wain and Michael Showalter and directed by Wain, the Netflix series is part of the Wet Hot American Summer franchise, following Wain's 2001 film Wet Hot American Summer and the 2015 prequel television series Wet Hot American Summer: First Day of Camp. The series consists of eight episodes, and was released on August 4, 2017.

Showalter cited St. Elmo's Fire, Singles, and The Big Chill as inspirations.

Cast

Returning cast from the film (in alphabetical order)
The following cast members reprised their roles from Wet Hot American Summer:

 Elizabeth Banks as Lindsay, now a newscaster (5 episodes)
 H. Jon Benjamin as Mitch/Can of Mixed Vegetables (5 episodes)
 Michael Ian Black as McKinley, now Ben's husband and a stay-at-home dad (7 episodes)
 Black also portrays U.S. sitting President George H. W. Bush
 Janeane Garofalo as Beth (7 episodes)
 Nina Hellman as Nancy (8 episodes)
 Joe Lo Truglio as Neil, now Victor's co-worker (4 episodes)
 Ken Marino as Victor, now a flair bartender (7 episodes)
 Christopher Meloni as Gene Jenkinson/Jonas Jurgenson (4 episodes)
 A. D. Miles as Gary, now a successful chef (5 episodes)
 Marguerite Moreau as Katie, now the VP of a cosmetics company (8 episodes)
 Zak Orth as J.J., now a video store clerk and Mark and Claire's best friend (8 episodes)
 David Hyde Pierce as Full Professor Henry Neumann (1 episode)
 Amy Poehler as Susie, now a Hollywood producer (6 episodes)
 Paul Rudd as Andy (6 episodes)
 Marisa Ryan as Abby, now a sex advisor (7 episodes)
 Molly Shannon as Gail (3 episodes)
 Michael Showalter as Coop, now a writer (8 episodes)
 Showalter also portrays U.S. former President Ronald Reagan

Returning cast from the previous miniseries
The following cast members reprised their roles from Wet Hot American Summer: First Day of Camp:
 Beth Dover as Shari, Neil's ex-girlfriend (3 episodes)
 Rob Huebel as Brodfard Gilroy (2 episodes)
 Samm Levine as Arty (5 episodes)
 David Wain as Yaron (6 episodes)
 Wain also portrays Arkansas Governor Bill Clinton
 Lake Bell as Donna (5 episodes)
 Paul Scheer as Dave, now Lindsay's producer (3 episodes)
 Josh Charles as Blake of Camp Tigerclaw (6 episodes)
 Kristen Wiig as Courtney of Camp Tigerclaw (1 episode)
 Rich Sommer as Graham of Camp Tigerclaw (6 episodes)
 Eric Nenninger as Warner of Camp Tigerclaw (6 episodes)
 John Early as Logan (4 episodes)
 Chris Pine as Eric (4 episodes)
 Jason Schwartzman as Greg (4 episodes)

New cast
Adam Scott as Ben, replacing Bradley Cooper (7 episodes)
Mark Feuerstein as Mark (8 episodes)
Sarah Burns as Claire (8 episodes)
Alyssa Milano as Renata Delvecchio née Murphy (5 episodes)
Jai Courtney as Garth MacArthur, Susie's lead actor (4 episodes)
Melanie Lynskey as Laura, Coop's editor (2 episodes)
Skyler Gisondo as Jeremy "Deegs" Deegenstein, the "new Andy" (3 episodes)
Joey Bragg as Seth (3 episodes)
Anne-Marie Johnson as Burkhart, Reagan's lackey (3 episodes)
Chris Redd as Mason (2 episodes)
Joshua Malina as Deep Throat (3 episodes)
Maya Erskine as Ginny, Coop's fiancée (3 episodes)
Marlo Thomas as Vivian (3 episodes)
Dax Shepard as Mikey (2 episodes)
Ava Acres as Jenny (2 episodes)

Episodes

Reception
The series holds a score of 77% on Rotten Tomatoes, based on 26 reviews, with an average rating of 6.61/10. The site's critic consensus states: "By owning its own ridiculousness, 10 Years Later is a fan-pleasing addition to the cult classic series." Metacritic reports a score of 67 out of 100, based on 12 critics.

Reviewing for Vulture, Jen Chaney described the series as "basically eight episodes of unabashed retro-fueled silliness that has no interest in trying to make anything resembling sense as far as of plot or continuity is concerned. [...] I mean that as a compliment." David Sims of The Atlantic criticized the "dialed back" humor and felt that "Ten Years Later will appeal to fans who just want to see everyone get back together, only this time dressed in goofy ’90s outfits."

References

External links
 Official website
 

 
2010s American satirical television series
2010s American comedy television miniseries
2017 American television series debuts
2017 American television series endings
English-language Netflix original programming
American sequel television series
Television series about summer camps
Live action television shows based on films
Television series set in the 1990s
Television series set in 1991
Television shows set in New York City
Television shows set in Maine